The Spanish Water Dog breed is used in Spain as a general purpose sheepdog and guard. It is also used sometimes as a gundog, and is skilled at retrieval from water.

Description

Appearance

The SWD is a medium size, athletic, robust dog that is slightly longer than tall. Approximately half are born with natural bobbed (short) tails. Long tailed dogs are usually docked in the US, but undocked tails are not a fault in conformation showing if the dog was bred in a non-docking country.

The head should be strong and carried with elegance. The skull is flat and the top is parallel with the top of the muzzle. The nose, eye-rims and paw pads are the same colour as the darkest part of the coat or darker. The eyes are expressive and set fairly wide apart. They should be hazel, chestnut or dark brown in colour, depending on the coat colour. The ears are set at medium height on the skull, and are triangular.

Coat and colour

It has a distinctive curly coat which is woolly in texture and may form cords when long. The coat should not be clipped or groomed for aesthetic purposes. Instead, it should look entirely natural, as though it is not groomed at all. It should never be trimmed, but sheared down at least once a year. SWD puppies are always born with curly hair.

The SWD can be seen in a variety of colours. It may be solid black, beige, brown, or white; bicolour where the second colour is white; or particolour . Tri-coloured dogs are strictly prohibited by the currently held (worldwide) standards for the breed as are black and tan or brown and tan colour combinations.

Size

The Spanish Water Dog is a medium-sized dog. The approximate measurements are:

 Males
 Height (at the withers): 
 Weight: 
 Females
 Height (at the withers): 
 Weight:

Temperament
The SWD is diligent, loyal, affectionate, and intelligent. They have very strong natural herding and guarding instincts, leading them to become the "self-appointed" guardians of their homes. SWDs thrive on work and play. Their athleticism and extremely hard working nature leads them to excel at any number of tasks. They can be wary with strangers, and early and continuing socialization with a variety of people and other animals is essential for a well-adjusted, social dog. Good socialization at an early age greatly helps them cohabit with small children.

Health

The breed's life expectancy is thought to be about 14 years. Recent health testing has uncovered the following issues:
 Hip dysplasia
 Progressive retinal atrophy (prcd-PRA)
 Hypothyroidism
 Hypoadrenocorticism (also known as Addison's disease)
 Exocrine pancreatic insufficiency
 Allergies
 Cataracts
Congenital hypothyroidism with goitre (CHG)
Distichia
Cherry eye
Neuroaxonal dystrophy

History
Originally there were three separated populations of SWD in Spain with somewhat different phenotypes and sizes. One of these populations was found in Northern Spain, in Asturias and Cantabria; these dogs were usually smaller and of lighter colour, becoming a new breed on 22 March 2011, the Cantabrian Water Dog. The other group could be found in the marshes of western Andalusia; this type of dogs had coats made of long and thin cords. And finally the largest group came from the southern Andalusian sierras; this type of dogs were the largest and strongest since they were mainly used for herding.

See also
 Dogs portal
 List of dog breeds

References

External links

 

FCI breeds
Water dogs
Gundogs
Herding dogs
Dog breeds originating in Andalusia
Rare dog breeds